Pratyek Thau : Pratyek Manchhe is a Nepali novel by writer and journalist Peter J. Karthak. It was published in 1978 by Sajha Prakashan. It is the first novel of the author who had previously penned an anthology of poems called Manas with poet Abhi Subedi.

Synopsis 
The book is set in Darjeeling, India where the author grew up. The story is based on a real life rape incident that took place in Darjeeling in October 1965.

Reception 
The book received the prestigious Sajha Puraskar for the year 2034 BS. Shankar Lamichhane wrote the foreword of the book. Lamichhane only wrote foreword for two books in his life, the other one being Shirishko Phool.

Translation 
The book was translated as Every Place : Every Person - A Himalayan Tale From Darjeeling by the author himself and published on December 1, 2004 by Vajra Books.

See also 

 Madhabi
 Faatsung
 Shirishko Phool

References 

20th-century Nepalese novels
Nepalese novels
Sajha Puraskar-winning works
1978 Nepalese novels
Nepali-language novels
Novels set in Darjeeling